Pinto Ben is a 1915 silent film western short written, directed by and starring William S. Hart. It had an alternate title of Horns and Hoofs and was released by Mutual Film. It was re-released in 1924 by Tri-Stone Pictures.

The film is preserved in the Library of Congress collection.

Cast 
 William S. Hart as Boss Rider
 Fritz the horse as Pinto Ben

References

External links
 
 lantern slide(Wayback Machine)

1915 films
1915 Western (genre) films
1915 short films
American silent short films
Films directed by William S. Hart
American black-and-white films
Mutual Film films
Silent American Western (genre) films
1910s American films
1910s English-language films